Michael Edwin Bullock (born 2 October 1946) is an English former footballer and football manager who played as a centre-forward.

He scored 109 goals in 469 appearances in the Football League playing for Birmingham City, Oxford United, Leyton Orient and Halifax Town.

Bullock served as coach at Halifax Town at the end of his playing career and became the manager on 13 July 1981. He was sacked on 22 October 1984. Bullock was manager for 148 league matches, of which Halifax won 39, drew 46 and lost 63; their highest finishing position was 11th in the Fourth Division in the 1982–83 season. His most notable signing was that of striker Bobby Davison, who was captured for a fee of £20,000 from Huddersfield Town and following success at Halifax signed for Derby County and then Leeds United.

Bullock later managed Goole Town, winning the West Riding County Cup. Appointed manager of Ossett Town in the summer of 1987, he led the club to successive promotions, from the Northern Counties East League Division 2 in 1989, and the following season from Division 1 to the Premier Division. Ossett also won the League Cup in 1990. Bullock left Ossett in 1991 and worked as a scout for a number of Football League clubs.

Bullock's older brother, Peter, played for Stoke City and Birmingham City, amongst others, in the 1960s.

References

External links
 

1946 births
Living people
Footballers from Stoke-on-Trent
English footballers
Association football forwards
Birmingham City F.C. players
Oxford United F.C. players
Leyton Orient F.C. players
Halifax Town A.F.C. players
English Football League players
English football managers
Halifax Town A.F.C. managers